The Hainan knobby newt (Tylototriton hainanensis) is a species of salamander in the family Salamandridae.
It is found only in the island of Hainan, China. It is known from the Wuzhi Mountains, Diaoluoshan, and Jianfengling. All these locations are nature reserves. Nevertheless, the species is threatened by habitat loss and degradation due to agriculture, clear-cutting and infrastructure development for tourist activities.

Hainan knobby newts live under dead leaves or root holes in heavily shaded forest in the mountains. Breeding season is in May.

References

Amphibians described in 1984
Tylototriton
Amphibians of China
Endemic fauna of Hainan
Taxonomy articles created by Polbot
Endangered Fauna of China